Amir Kola (also Romanized as Amīr Kolā and Amīr Kalā; also known as Amīrābād and Amīr Kolā Kūlā) is a village in Kaseliyan Rural District, in the Central District of Savadkuh County, Mazandaran Province, Iran. At the 2006 census, its population was 108, in 23 families.

References 

Populated places in Savadkuh County